John Weisbrod (born October 8, 1968) is an American former professional ice hockey player, who previously served as Assistant General Manager for the Vancouver Canucks until December 5, 2021.

Early life and playing career
Weisbrod played for Harvard from 1987 to 1991, highlighted by an NCAA Championship in 1989.  Weisbrod was drafted by the Minnesota North Stars in round 4, #73 overall in the 1987 NHL Entry Draft and then was acquired and signed by San Jose in 1991. Weisbrod retired following a shoulder injury in 1993.

Early Front-Office Work
Weisbrod was General Manager and Director of Operations for the Albany River Rats from 1993 to 1997, winning the Calder Cup in 1995.  From 1997 to 2000, Weisbrod served as VP and GM of the RDV Sports IHL Orlando Solar Bears.

NBA Executive

Orlando Magic
In April 2000, Weisbrod was named Chief Operating Officer of RDV Sports, putting him in charge of the business operations of all of the RDV entities (Orlando Magic NBA, Orlando Solar Bears IHL, Orlando Miracle WNBA, and the RDV Sportsplex).  He was still the General Manager of the Solar Bears where he guided the team to the IHL Turner Cup Championship in 2001 and remained in that position until the IHL disbanded in June 2001. In 2004, he was named General Manager of the Orlando Magic, a title he held while remaining COO of RDV Sports. On May 23, 2005, Weisbrod resigned from his position of General Manager and Chief Operating Officer of the Orlando Magic, citing an opportunity to return to an executive position in the National Hockey League.

NHL Executive

Dallas Stars
On July 14, 2005, the Dallas Stars of the NHL announced that Weisbrod had joined the team as a scout for the New England region.

Boston Bruins
After a season with the Stars, Weisbrod joined the scouting staff of the Boston Bruins on September 14, 2006 as a pro scout based out of Tampa, Florida. After two seasons scouting the professional leagues, Weisbrod became the Bruins' Director of Collegiate Scouting.

Calgary Flames
On June 27, 2011, Weisbrod was named the Assistant General Manager of Player Personnel of the Calgary Flames after winning a Stanley Cup ring with the Bruins. On December 12, 2013, he was relieved of his duties.

Vancouver Canucks
On July 7, 2014, Weisbrod was named vice president of player personnel for the Canucks.  On August 4, 2015, he was promoted to assistant general manager. On December 5, 2021, he was relieved of his duties.

References

1968 births
Living people
American men's ice hockey centers
Boston Bruins scouts
Calgary Flames executives
Calgary Flames general managers
American chief operating officers
Dallas Stars scouts
Harvard Crimson men's ice hockey players
Ice hockey players from New York (state)
Kansas City Blades players
Minnesota North Stars draft picks
National Basketball Association general managers
New Jersey Devils scouts
Orlando Magic executives
Stanley Cup champions
Vancouver Canucks executives
NCAA men's ice hockey national champions